Macau Esporte Clube, commonly known as Macau, is a Brazilian football club based in Macau, Rio Grande do Norte state.

History
The club was founded on June 8, 1978. Macau won the Campeonato Potiguar Second Level in 2005.

Achievements

 Campeonato Potiguar Second Level:
 Winners (1): 2005

Stadium
Macau Esporte Clube play their home games at Estádio Wálter Bichão. The stadium has a maximum capacity of 3,500 people.

References

Football clubs in Rio Grande do Norte
Association football clubs established in 1978
1978 establishments in Brazil